Dimtu may refer to:

 Dimtu, town in Wolaita Zone, Ethiopia
 Jaba Dimtu, settlement in Kenya
 Tullu Dimtu, fourth highest peak in Ethiopia

Disambiguation pages